Matriz may refer to the following subjects:

Places in Portugal 
Matriz (Borba), a civil parish in the municipality of Borba
Matriz (Horta), a civil parish in the municipality of Horta, island of Faial (Azores)
Matriz (Ribeira Grande), a civil parish in the municipality of Ribeira Grande, island of São Miguel (Azores)
Matriz, the former name of São Sebastião (Ponta Delgada), a civil parish in the municipality of Ponta Delgada, island of São Miguel (Azores)

Other uses 
 Matriz (album), by Brazilian singer-songwriter Pitty